Owen David Kember (23 January 1943 – 11 January 2004) was an English first-class cricketer active 1962–63 who played for Surrey. He was born in Crowhurst; died in Bourn.

References

1943 births
2004 deaths
English cricketers
Surrey cricketers
Cambridge University cricketers